The Flash Wolves are a Taiwanese esports organization with players competing in Arena of Valor, Hearthstone, and League of Legends: Wild Rift. They formerly had teams competing in League of Legends, Overwatch, Special Force II, StarCraft II, and World of Tanks.

The Flash Wolves' League of Legends team was created after the draft in the Taiwan eSports League Draft Season. It competed in the League of Legends Masters Series (LMS)—the top league in Taiwan, Hong Kong and Macau—and was one of the best teams in the region. The team reached the quarterfinals of the World Championship for the first time in 2015.

League of Legends

History

2013 
The Flash Wolves were originally established under the name yoe IRONMEN on 15 April 2013, after the draft season of the Taiwan e-Sports League (TeSL). After finishing 6th in the TeSL, the team struggled in the Season 3 Taiwan Regional Finals group stage and received the last slot in group B, prompting four of the five players on the team to leave. As a result, the team announced it would forfeit all its remaining matches and began reforming itself. On 22 August, the team rebranded as yoe Flash Wolves and signed nearly the entire roster of Gamania Bears on 21 October, automatically qualifying them for the 2014 LNL Winter and the 2014 GPL Winter splits. However, they gave up their spot in the latter due to Riot Games' player age limit rules.

The Flash Wolves made an impressive return in the 2013 WCG Taiwan Qualifiers, defeating two established Taiwanese powerhouses, the Taipei Assassins and ahq e-Sports Club, and earning a spot in the 2013 World Cyber Games.

2014 
In 2014, the Flash Wolves saw several roster changes: Dee left the team on 13 January; on 24 January, Mountain joined as the team's new starting jungler, REFRA1N moved to the mid lane, Maple became a substitute player, and HueiYun left; Maooo and Maple were moved to the academy team yoe Flash Wolves Junior on 21 February; and Mountain left on 30 April. The Flash Wolves finished 4th in the LNL Winter split.

2015 

The Flash Wolves finished first at IEM Season IX – Taipei on 30 January by beating the Taipei Assassins 2–1. In March, the Flash Wolves defeated SK Gaming in the second round of the group state at IEM Season IX Katowice, qualifying for the semifinals, where they were defeated by Team SoloMid 2–1.

The Flash Wolves finished 2nd in both the 2015 LMS Spring playoffs and the 2015 LMS Summer regular season, and 3rd in the 2015 LMS Summer playoffs.

In May, the Flash Wolves announced the formation of a female League of Legends team.

The Flash Wolves were the 2nd seed representing the Taiwan/Hong Kong/Macau region in the 2015 League of Legends World Championship. On 11 October, Kaohsiung Mayor Chen Chu made a surprise visit to Paris to meet with the Flash Wolves and ahq e-Sports Club, wishing them luck in the World Championship. The team won their preliminary group, but finished in 5th–8th overall after losing to Origen 1–3.

2016 
The Flash Wolves finished 2nd in the 2016 LMS Spring Split regular season with 9 wins, 2 draws and 3 losses. Heading into the playoffs, the team was able to defeat both Machi and ahq in 3–0 sweeps, winning their first LMS title. This qualified them for the 2016 Mid-Season Invitational, where they managed to take games off SK Telecom T1, G2 Esports and SuperMassive eSports, advancing to the semifinals. However, the Flash Wolves ultimately lost their series 1–3 to Counter Logic Gaming, placing 3rd–4th.

The Flash Wolves finished 2nd in the 2016 LMS Summer Split regular season, but were able to win their 2nd LMS title after defeating ahq in a close five-game series and J Team in a convincing 3–0 sweep. Qualifying for the 2016 World Championship as the #1 seed from the LMS, the Flash Wolves were drawn into Group B against South Korea's SK Telecom T1, China's IMay and North America's Cloud9. They finished last in their group with a record of 2 wins to 4 losses.

2019 
The Flash Wolves announced on 13 December 2019 that it was disbanding its League of Legends team and would not participate in the upcoming Pacific Championship Series (PCS), the successor to the LMS.

Final roster

Streamers

Tournament results

Premier tournaments 
 5th–8th — 2013 World Cyber Games

2014 
 5th–8th — 2014 GPL Spring
 4th — 2014 LNL Winter

2015 
 1st — 2015 LMS Regional Qualifiers
 3rd — 2015 LMS Summer Playoffs
 2nd — 2015 LMS Spring Playoffs
 1st — 2015 LMS Spring Round Robin
 3rd–4th — IEM Season IX World Championship Katowice
 1st — IEM Season IX – Taipei
 5th–8th — 2015 League of Legends World Championship

2017 
 1st — IEM Season XI – Katowice

Arena of Valor

Roster

Tournament results

2020 
 1st — Arena of Valor Premier League 2020
 2nd — GCS Summer 2020

Special Force II 
The Taichung Flash Wolves were one of the top Special Force II teams in Taiwan and began competing in the inaugural Special Force II Pro League that began in October 2015.

StarCraft II 
The Flash Wolves' former StarCraft II roster consisted of PartinG, Leenock, San, Has and Ian.

References

External links 

  

2013 establishments in Taiwan
Esports teams based in Taiwan
Esports teams established in 2013
Hearthstone teams
Former League of Legends Master Series teams
Defunct and inactive Overwatch teams
World of Tanks teams
Defunct and inactive StarCraft teams
Sport in Taichung